Some Devil is the only studio album by musician Dave Matthews. It was released on September 23, 2003 on RCA Records. It has been certified platinum by the RIAA, signifying over a million copies sold. The album features several guest musicians, including long-time Dave Matthews Band collaborator guitarist Tim Reynolds and Phish frontman and guitarist Trey Anastasio. The album's first single, "Gravedigger," won a Grammy Award in 2004. Some Devil was recorded at Studio Litho in Seattle, Washington, and produced by Stephen Harris, who had previously worked with the Dave Matthews Band on their 2002 album Busted Stuff.

Of the album, Matthews said: "I hadn't really been thinking about doing a solo album until I had a handful of songs that didn't really fit with the band, so I started with those and it just grew into a full record," Matthews said. "I kind of thought it'd be fun to put it out."

Many fans, while at first skeptical of Matthews' desire to release a solo album, quickly praised his efforts. The album is noted for its moodier tone and the fresh direction shown in Matthews' songwriting.

Since 2003, Matthews has performed Some Devil material in concert with a group coined Dave Matthews & Friends, which consisted mainly of musicians that appear on the album. He has also played album material solo and with long-time acoustic duo partner Tim Reynolds. During the 2008 summer tour, Dave Matthews Band played "Gravedigger" and "So Damn Lucky" regularly, with "Stay or Leave" following suit during the 2009 summer tour.

The song "Some Devil" featured in the House episode "Love Hurts", the Freeform show Pretty Little Liars, and the closing credits to the 2003 film 21 Grams. Finally, the song "So Damn Lucky" is in The CW show Privileged.

The limited edition version of the album includes a 7-track bonus CD featuring songs from the Dave Matthews/Tim Reynolds 2003 tour. These are Grey Street (4-3-03, Elliott Hall of Music, Purdue University); When the World Ends (3-28-03, Lawrence Joel Veterans Memorial Coliseum); Jimi Thing (3-22-03, Radio City Music Hall); Stay or Leave (4-3-03, Elliott Hall of Music, Purdue University); Seek up (3-20-03, Ryan Center, University of Rhode Island); Crush (3-28-03, Lawrence Joel Veterans Memorial Coliseum) and Drive In Drive Out (3-20-03, Ryan Center, University of Rhode Island).

Track listing
All songs by Dave J. Matthews unless noted.

"Dodo" – 4:57
"So Damn Lucky" (Matthews, Harris)  – 4:34
"Gravedigger"  – 3:53
"Some Devil"  – 4:04
"Trouble" (Matthews, Harris)  – 5:44
"Grey Blue Eyes" (Matthews, Anastasio, Harris)  – 3:01
"Save Me"  – 4:33
"Stay or Leave"  – 4:02
"An' Another Thing"  – 5:30
"Oh"  – 2:48
"Baby"  – 2:19
"Up and Away" – 4:19
"Too High"  – 5:38
"Gravedigger" (acoustic) – 3:52

Personnel
Musicians
 Dave Matthews — vocals, guitars , acoustic guitar , electric guitar , sitar guitar , baritone guitar , vocal percussion with:
 Brady Blade — drums , percussion 
 Tony Hall — bass guitar 
 Tim Reynolds — guitar , electric guitar , acoustic guitar , sitar guitar 
 Trey Anastasio — electric guitar , piano , intro guitar 
 Stephen Harris — keyboards , harmonium , programming , percussion 

Additional musicians
 Alex Veley — organ 
 Dirty Dozen Brass Band — horns 
 Roger Lewis – baritone saxophone
 Kevin Harris – tenor saxophone
 Efrem Towns – flugelhorn
 Sammy Williams – trombone
 Audrey Riley – string arrangements , horn arrangements , orchestral arrangements 
 Seattlemusic Group Strings – strings 
 Leonid Keylin, Misha Keylin, Mikhail Schmidt, John Weller, Jean Wells Yablonsky, Peter Kaman, Paul Shure, Bonnie Douglas, Gennady Filimonov, Jennifer Bai, Karen Bentley, Anne Sokol, Steve Bryant, Jennifer Sokol, Clark Story, Mariel Bailey, Marcia Steel, Jamie Laval, Xiao-Po Fei – violin
 Vincent Comer, Susan Bryant, Cynthia Morrow, Dajana Hobson, Wes Dyring, Shari Link, Michael Lieberman, Eileen Swanson, Andrea Schuler, Heather Bentley – viola
 David Sabee, Walter Gray, Bruce Bailey, Roberta Downey, Theresa Benshoof, Jackie Robbins, Rajan Krishnaswami, Clare Garabedian – cello
 Jordan Anderson, Todd Gowers, Chuck Deardorf, Anna Doak – bass
 Seattlemusic Group Horns (Mark Robbins, Susan Carroll, James Weaver, Rodger Burnett) — horns 
 Seattlemusic String Quartet – strings 
 Leonid Keylin, Misha Keylin – violin
 Vincent Comer – viola
 David Sabee – cello
 Total Experience Gospel Choir — backing vocals 
 DeShe' Brooks-Wright, Tanisha Brooks, Gena Brooks, Lulu Strange, Mary Strange, Sherri Charleston-Johnson – choir
 Patrinell Wright – director

Technical personnel
 Mark Branch – second orchestral engineering 
 Rob Haggett – mixing assistant , assistant mix Pro Tools engineer
 Stephen Harris – producer, mixing 
 Sam Hofstedt – additional assistant engineer
 Ted Jensen – mastering
 Ric Levy – mixing assistant 
 Floyd Reitsma – assistant engineer , mixing assistant 
 John Schluckender – second orchestral engineering 
 Mark "Spike" Stent – mixing 
 Dave Treahearn – assistant mix Pro Tools engineer
 Brian Valentino – assistant engineer , string Pro Tools engineering 
 Paul "P-Dub" Walton – mix Pro Tools engineer
 John Whynot – orchestral engineering

Charts

Weekly charts

Year-end charts

References

2003 debut albums
RCA Records albums
Dave Matthews albums